Harry Chapman Thayer (December 31, 1873 – August 4, 1936) was an All-American football player.He played halfback and fullback for the Penn Quakers football team of the University of Pennsylvania from 1891 to 1892, and was chosen for the 1892 College Football All-America Team. After playing fullback for Penn in 1891, Thayer completed his undergraduate studies.  He returned to Penn in the fall of 1892 as a post-graduate student at the Wharton School of Business. was during his post-graduate work the Thayer was selected as an All-American.

References

1873 births
1936 deaths
19th-century players of American football
American football fullbacks
American football halfbacks
Penn Quakers football players
Philadelphian cricketers
All-American college football players
Players of American football from Philadelphia
Cricketers from Philadelphia
American cricketers